Liparis goodyeroides is a species of plant in the family Orchidaceae. It is found in Cameroon and Nigeria. Its natural habitat is subtropical or tropical dry forests. It is threatened by habitat loss.

References

goodyeroides
Orchids of Cameroon
Orchids of Nigeria
Critically endangered plants
Taxonomy articles created by Polbot